Heartland is a platform game for the ZX Spectrum, Amstrad CPC, and Commodore 64 released by Odin Computer Graphics in 1986.

Plot
The Heartland has fallen under the rule of the ruthless tyrant Midan and his minions. To overthrow him, the final six pages of a magical book must be found and assembled. However, to confuse would-be adventurers Midan has created six evil pages; these must also be destroyed.

Gameplay
The game is very similar to the earlier Odin titles Nodes of Yesod and Arc of Yesod. The player must locate the six magical pages and also destroy the six dark pages. Various spells may be collected, including a magical hat which may be thrown to kill enemies. Knives and fireballs can also be used to attack enemies. Contact with enemies will cause the player to lose energy; as he grows weaker the face of Midan gradually appears at the top of the screen.

Reception

Sinclair User wrote, "Stunning to look at, delightful to play, HEARTLAND is magical and stylish. Simple without being simple-minded." Crash reviewed the game stating "This is a very nice game. The graphics are fabulous, and the animation is really rather neat and the game itself is very attractively designed. Playability-wise, Heartland is very good indeed, and it’s also addictive. Lots of things combine to make this one of the better games on the Spectrum".

Zzap!64's reviewers complimented the game's graphics and playability and said it was "another high quality arcade adventure from Odin".

References

External links

Heartland at Lemon 64
Heartland at C64.com
Heartland at CPC-Power

1986 video games
ZX Spectrum games
Commodore 64 games
Amstrad CPC games
Platform games
Video games developed in the United Kingdom